In mathematics, weak convergence in a Hilbert space is convergence of a sequence of points in the weak topology.

Definition
A sequence of points  in a Hilbert space H is said to converge weakly to a point x in H if

for all y in H.  Here,  is understood to be the inner product on the Hilbert space. The notation

is sometimes used to denote this kind of convergence.

Properties
If a sequence converges strongly (that is, if it converges in norm), then it converges weakly as well.
Since every closed and bounded set is weakly relatively compact (its closure in the weak topology is compact), every bounded sequence  in a Hilbert space H contains a weakly convergent subsequence. Note that closed and bounded sets are not in general weakly compact in Hilbert spaces (consider the set consisting of an orthonormal basis in an infinitely dimensional Hilbert space which is closed and bounded but not weakly compact since it doesn't contain 0). However, bounded and weakly closed sets are weakly compact so as a consequence every convex bounded closed set is weakly compact.
As a consequence of the principle of uniform boundedness, every weakly convergent sequence is bounded.
The norm is (sequentially) weakly lower-semicontinuous: if  converges weakly to x, then

and this inequality is strict whenever the convergence is not strong. For example, infinite orthonormal sequences converge weakly to zero, as demonstrated below.

If the Hilbert space is finite-dimensional, i.e. a Euclidean space, then weak and strong convergence are equivalent.

Example

The Hilbert space  is the space of the square-integrable functions on the interval  equipped with the inner product defined by

(see Lp space). The sequence of functions  defined by

tends to zero for any square-integrable function  on  when  goes to infinity, which is by Riemann–Lebesgue lemma,  i.e.

This dissimilarity is one of the reasons why this type of convergence is considered to be "weak."

Weak convergence of orthonormal sequences
Consider a sequence  which was constructed to be orthonormal, that is,

where  equals one if m = n and zero otherwise.  We claim that if the sequence is infinite, then it converges weakly to zero. A simple proof is as follows. For x ∈ H, we have

 (Bessel's inequality)

where equality holds when {en} is a Hilbert space basis. Therefore

 (since the series above converges, its corresponding sequence must go to zero)

i.e.

Banach–Saks theorem
The Banach–Saks theorem states that every bounded sequence  contains a subsequence  and a point x such that

converges strongly to x as N goes to infinity.

Generalizations

The definition of weak convergence can be extended to Banach spaces. A sequence of points  in a Banach space B is said to converge weakly to a point x in B if

In the case where  is a Hilbert space, then, by the Riesz representation theorem,

See also

References

Convergence (mathematics)
Hilbert space